Teddy Bartouche-Selbonne (born 5 June 1997) is a French professional footballer who plays as a goalkeeper for French club Lorient.

Career
After beginning his senior career with JA Drancy, Bartouche signed his first professional contract with FC Lorient on 9 January 2020. He made his professional debut with Lorient in a 2–1 Coupe de France win over Paris FC on 2 February 2021.

Personal life
Born in Metropolitan France, Bartouche is of Guadeloupean descent.

References

External links
 
 Ligue 1 Profile
 FCL Profile

1997 births
Living people
People from Lagny-sur-Marne
French footballers
French people of Guadeloupean descent
Association football goalkeepers
Championnat National 2 players
FC Lorient players